Liang Qin (born 28 July 1972) is a Chinese fencer. She won a bronze medal in the women's team épée event at the 2000 Summer Olympics.

References

1972 births
Living people
Chinese female fencers
Olympic fencers of China
Fencers at the 2000 Summer Olympics
Olympic bronze medalists for China
Olympic medalists in fencing
Medalists at the 2000 Summer Olympics
Asian Games medalists in fencing
Fencers at the 1990 Asian Games
Fencers at the 1998 Asian Games
Asian Games gold medalists for China
Asian Games bronze medalists for China
Medalists at the 1990 Asian Games
Medalists at the 1998 Asian Games
20th-century Chinese women
21st-century Chinese women